Woolley railway station was a small station on the Ashover Light Railway and it served the small village of Woolley Moor in North East Derbyshire, England. The station had a wooden shelter and a telephone box. As well as a platelayers hut. It was located just north of Ogston Reservoir, passenger traffic was initially good. After closure in 1950, the site was demolished and nothing remains of the station but the trackbed is visible although the section to Stretton has been submerged.

References

Disused railway stations in Derbyshire
Railway stations in Great Britain opened in 1925
Railway stations in Great Britain closed in 1936
1925 establishments in England
1950 disestablishments in England